Bedtime Prayers is the second full-length album released by the Swedish melodic death metal band Blinded Colony. It is the only full album to feature new vocalist Johan Schuster, and also the first album under Pivotal Rockordings.

Track listing
"My Halo" – 3:16
"Bedtime Prayers" – 3:59
"Once Bitten, Twice Shy" – 3:48
"Need" – 4:13
"Revelation, Now!" – 3:48
"21st Century Holocaust" – 3:59
"Aaron's Sons" – 4:29
"In Here" – 3:41
"Heart" – 4:31

Personnel
Johan Schuster – vocals
Tobias Olsson – guitars
Johan Blomstrom – guitars
Roy Erlandsson – bass
Staffan Franzen – drums
Davide Nadalin – cover art

Release history

2007 albums
The Blinded albums